Rich But Honest is a 1927 American silent comedy-drama film, written by Randall H. Faye and directed by Albert Ray and Horace Hough. The film was released on May 22, 1927 by Fox Film Corporation, starring Nancy Nash, John Holland, Charles Morton, and J. Farrell MacDonald.

Cast
Nancy Nash as Florine Candless 
John Holland as Bob Hendricks
Charles Morton as Dick Carter
J. Farrell MacDonald as Diamond Jim O'Grady
Tyler Brooke as Barney Zoom
Ted McNamara as Heinie
Marjorie Beebe as Maybelle
Ernest Shields as Archie
Doris Lloyd as Mrs. O'Grady
Coy Watson Jr. as Jimmie (uncredited)

Preservation
The film is now considered lost.

See also
List of lost films
1937 Fox vault fire

References

External links

1927 films
1920s English-language films
1927 comedy-drama films
American silent feature films
American black-and-white films
Lost American films
Fox Film films
1920s American films
Lost comedy-drama films
Silent American comedy-drama films
1927 lost films